Odostomia turriculata is a species of sea snail, a marine gastropod mollusc in the family Pyramidellidae, the pyrams and their allies.

Description
The length of the shell varies between 1.2 mm and 4 mm. Odostomia paardekooperi van Aartsen, Gittenberger & Goud, 1998 is very similar but Odostomia turriculata has flexuous and opisthocline growth lines and similar but larger embryonic whorls .

Distribution
This species occurs in the following locations:
 European waters (ERMS scope)
 Greek Exclusive Economic Zone
 Portuguese Exclusive Economic Zone
 Spanish Exclusive Economic Zone

References

External links
 To Biodiversity Heritage Library (3 publications)
 To CLEMAM
 To Encyclopedia of Life
 To World Register of Marine Species
 

turriculata
Gastropods described in 1869